The South Sandwich Trench is a deep arcuate trench in the South Atlantic Ocean lying  to the east of the South Sandwich Islands. It is the deepest trench of the Southern Atlantic Ocean, and the second deepest of the Atlantic Ocean after the Puerto Rico Trench. Since the trench extends south of the 60th parallel south, it also contains the deepest point in the Southern Ocean.

This sounding was made during the German Meteor expedition. The depth is named after the German survey ship Meteor, which first surveyed the area as part of its namesake expedition in 1926. The deepest point below the 60th parallel south, the deepest point in the Southern Ocean, is dubbed by Victor Vescovo as the Factorian Deep, a name that he hopes will become official.

This measurement was made during the first complete sonar mapping of the trench which covered its entire length, with a measurement error of +/- . The deepest point of the South Sandwich Trench is only  shallower than the deepest point in the Puerto Rico Trench, sometimes known as the Milwaukee or Brownson Deep.

The trench is produced by the subduction of the southernmost portion of the South American Plate beneath the small South Sandwich Plate. The South Sandwich Islands constitute a volcanic island arc which results from this active subduction. Mount Belinda on Montagu Island is an active volcano.

Meteor Deep 2019 survey

This new deepest point is part of the same subsurface feature as the previous Meteor Deep location so the expedition recommended keeping the old name.

Pressure Drop completed an entire survey of the trench on February 9, 2019 and will be making the data publicly available to GEBCO in 2019. Approximately ten other major subsurface features including various deeps, seamounts, and ridges—previously unidentified—were mapped by the vessel and new names for the features will be submitted to the International Hydrographic Organization (IHO) later in 2019.

"Factorian Deep" crewed descent
The southernmost portion of the South Sandwich Trench reaches south of 60°S latitude and is therefore in the Southern Ocean. The maximum depth of that ocean is also in the South Sandwich Trench, which was surveyed by the Five Deeps Expedition in early February 2019. The expedition leader and chief submersible pilot Victor Vescovo has proposed naming this deepest point in the Southern Ocean the "Factorian Deep," based on the name of the crewed submersible DSV Limiting Factor, in which he successfully visited the bottom for the first time on February 4, 2019. The deepest points of a maritime trench have historically been named after the vessel that first discovered or explored them.

See also
 Antarctica
 Scotia Sea

References

 Structural evolution of the Scotia Sea floor during paleogene-quaternary period (West Antarctic)

Physical oceanography
Oceanic trenches of the Atlantic Ocean
Subduction zones